Events from the year 1440 in France

Incumbents
 Monarch – Charles VII

Events
 2 July – Richard, Duke of York is appointed as commander of English forces in France for the second time
 31 August – The siege of Tartas begins as part of the Hundred Years War
 22 October – Gilles de Rais is executed in Nantes
 Unknown – The Praguerie rebellion breaks out against the rule of Charles VII

References

1440s in France